Mestský futbalový štadión is a multi-use stadium in Dubnica nad Váhom, Slovakia.  It is currently used mostly for football matches and is the home ground of MFK Dubnica.  The stadium holds 5,450 people. The intensity of the floodlighting is 1,400 lux.

History
The stadium was built in 1942 and used for football matches of MFK Dubnica sport club. Due to renovation work in 1990s the capacity was increased to 5,450.

International matches
Mestský štadión has hosted two competitive matches of the Slovakia national football team.

Stadium
Football venues in Slovakia
Buildings and structures in Trenčín Region
Sports venues completed in 1942
1942 establishments in Slovakia